(born October 28, 1968) is a Japanese professional wrestler. She is currently working for Oz Academy.

Career
Ozaki debuted in a tag team match in August, 1986.
 In her career, she held the WWWA tag titles with Dynamite Kansai from April 11, 1993 to December 6, 1993 (both winning from and losing to Manami Toyota and Toshiyo Yamada of All Japan Women's Pro-Wrestling, selected for "Wrestling Observer Newsletter's Match of the Year for 1993". They rematched in April 1993 and won at the Dreamslam II (and with it the titles); the first time a woman's match won the award. Their final match was at St. Battle Final in December. (AJW).
 She also held the UWA Junior and JWP Junior titles between 1988 and 1991, and teamed with Cutie Suzuki and Hikari Fukuoka to win the JWP Tag Titles a number of times between 1992 and 1995. She held the AAAW Tag Team Championship with Aja Kong, beating GAEA's Sugar Sato and Chikayo Nagashima on August 23, 1998 in Tokyo.

In 1995 Ozaki competed at the 1995 World War 3 on pay-per-view event where she teamed with Cutie Suzuki against Bull Nakano and Akira Hokuto where they lost. They also competed against the same team the very next night on WCW Monday Nitro which they also lost.

Until recently, Ozaki usually wrestled in JWP Joshi Puroresu, but was also the leader of her own heel stable called the Oz Academy, which freelanced in other women's promotions in Japan, such as AJW and GAEA. In 1998 Ozaki became a true free agent, and began to promote her own shows using her Oz Academy wrestlers, looking for a niche in the fragmented women's puroresu scene. Ozaki made her mark mostly in tag team matches as she competed in four bouts that were among the greatest ever in women's tag team wrestling, having earned a 5-star rating each by the Wrestling Observer Newsletter.

In December 2011, Ozaki took part in American promotion Chikara's JoshiMania weekend, teaming with Mio Shirai in a losing effort against the team of Cherry and Ayako Hamada on night one on December 2. The following day, Ozaki defeated Shirai in a singles match. On the third and final night of the tour, Ozaki defeated Kaori Yoneyama in another singles match.

Championships and accomplishments
All Japan Women's Pro-Wrestling
WWWA World Tag Team Championship (1 time) – with Dynamite Kansai
Gaea Japan
AAAW Single Championship (1 time)
AAAW Tag Team Championship (3 times) – with Aja Kong (1), Akira Hokuto (1), and Kaoru (1)
Gaora Cup (2001)
Tag Team Tournament (1998) – with Chikayo Nagashima
Tag Team Tournament (2001) – with Kaoru
Japan Women's Pro Wrestling
JWP Junior Championship (3 times)
UWA Junior Championship (1 time)
JWP Joshi Puroresu
JWP Openweight Championship (1 time)
JWP Tag Team Championship (3 times) – with Cutie Suzuki (2), and Hikari Fukuoka (1)
Oz Academy
Oz Academy Openweight Championship (3 times)
Oz Academy Tag Team Championship (6 times) – with Kaoru (2), Yumi Ohka (1), Kyusei Sakura Hirota (1), Mio Shirai (1) and Maya Yukihi (1)
Best Bout Award (2013) vs. Chikayo Nagashima on September 15
Best Singles Match Award (2010) vs. Kaoru on August 22
Oz Academy Openweight Title #1 Contendership League (2008)
Oz Academy Openweight Title #1 Contendership Tournament (2019)
Best Singles Match Award (2011) vs. Aja Kong on April 10
MVP Award (2011)
Pro Wrestling Wave
Catch the Wave Best Performance Award (2016)
Super Fireworks Pro Wrestling
 Blast Queen Championship (1 time)
Wrestling Observer Newsletter
Match of the Year (1993) with Dynamite Kansai vs. Manami Toyota and Toshiyo Yamada on April 11

Publications

Books

Magazines

Manga

Videos

Music

References

External links

Oz Academy profile

1968 births
20th-century professional wrestlers
21st-century professional wrestlers
Japanese female professional wrestlers
Living people
Sportspeople from Saitama Prefecture
Oz Academy Openweight Champions
Oz Academy Tag Team Champions
AAAW Single Champions
AAAW Tag Team Champions